Ragnar Sigvald Skancke (9 November 1890 – 28 August 1948) was the Norwegian Minister for Church and Educational Affairs in Vidkun Quisling's Nasjonal Samling government during World War II. Shot for treason in the legal purges following the war, he remains the last person executed in Norway.  

Before the war, Skancke was a highly respected professor of electrical engineering at the Norwegian Institute of Technology in Trondheim and a member of the Royal Norwegian Society of Sciences and Letters.

Pre-war life
Skancke was born in Ås, Norway, the son of bank director Johan Skancke and Kari Busvold. In 1908 he became a student, and in 1913 gained a Bachelor of Engineering in Karlsruhe, Germany.

Skancke worked as a docent at the Norwegian Institute of Technology in Trondheim from 1913 to 1918, and then spent the next five years as an supervising engineer at the telecommunication company Elektrisk Bureau. From 1923 onwards, Skancke was a professor at the Norwegian Institute of Technology. He married Ingrid Aas (born 1888) in 1927.

World War II collaboration

Political positions

April 1940 "coup" government
The first political position given to Professor Skancke was that of Minister of Labour in Vidkun Quisling's April 1940 "coup" government, the latter's attempt at seizing power in Norway following the German invasion of 9 April. Skancke was in Trondheim at the time, and only heard of his appointment when it was announced on the radio. He reacted with opposition to Quisling's attempt to form a government, refusing to assume the ministry allotted to him.

Terboven council and NS government
Reichskommissar Josef Terboven, the leading civilian German leader in occupied Norway, on 25 September 1940 appointed a council of Norwegian ministers to assist him in governing Norway. Skancke was appointed as Councillor of State for Church and Educational Affairs, and was given the title Minister for Church and Educational Affairs exactly a year later.

Acts during war
During his collaborationist work in occupied Norway Skancke mostly acted in passive ways, but did not hesitate to enact countermeasures if he met opposition to his work. Although not taking a leading part in the attempted nazification of the Norwegian Church and school system, he did take full responsibility for the sacking of bishops, priests and teachers opposed to National socialist teachings. He also ordered Norwegian teachers and school children to attend a Hitler Youth exhibition in Oslo in February 1941, which led to the first school strike of the occupation, and ordered the confiscation of books by authors opposed to Quisling. Skancke, however, was completely opposed to the deportation to Finnmark of teachers who would not institute the new teaching programmes. In one instance of refusal to cooperate fully with the German authorities, Skancke delayed acting on an order from Reichskommissar Terboven issued on 5 July 1941 that all Norwegian church bells were to be sent to Germany for smelting and use in the war industry. The case dragged out until it was handed over to minister of trade Eivind Blehr in 1942. Blehr refused to release the bells, leading to several confrontations with Terboven until the Germans were later persuaded to drop the demands, saving all the bells.

Post-war conviction and execution

Trials
Following the May 1945 German capitulation in Norway and the rest of Europe, Skancke was put on trial for treason. He was convicted and sentenced to death in 1946. In March 1947, the Norwegian Supreme Court rejected Skancke's appeals and confirmed the sentence. In response to the confirmation of his sentence, Skancke attempted to get a retrial, presenting new evidence and witness testimonies. During this process, the mood in Norway largely changed with many calls for clemency for the former collaborationist minister.

Execution
As all calls for clemency were rejected Skancke was executed by firing squad at Akershus Fortress on 28 August 1948, the last person to be executed in Norway, which has since abolished capital punishment for all crimes, including war crimes and treason. Before his execution, the Norwegian High Court had received letters from 668 priests who begged for mercy on Skancke's behalf. Ragnar Skancke was one of only three Norwegian Nazi leaders to be executed for political crimes in the post-war legal purge, the others being Quisling and Internal affairs minister Albert Viljam Hagelin, all the 34 other Norwegians and Germans executed in the post war process having been convicted of murder, torture or systematic informing.

Published works
In addition to professional works on electrical engineering in the 1930s, Skancke also wrote a book on Vidkun Quisling.

 Theorie der Wechselstrommaschinen mit e. Einl. in d. Theorie d. stationären Wechselströme nach O. S. Bragstad, J. Springer, Berlin 1932 
 Über ultraakustische Schwingungen in zylindrischen Stäben, Brun, Trondheim 1935 
 Boken om Vidkun Quisling, Blix, Oslo 1941 
 Ein Buch über Vidkun Quisling, Blix, Oslo 1941 (German translation)

Notes

1890 births
1948 deaths
People from Ås, Akershus
Norwegian expatriates in Germany
Executed Norwegian collaborators with Nazi Germany
Members of Nasjonal Samling
Royal Norwegian Society of Sciences and Letters
Academic staff of the Norwegian Institute of Technology
Norwegian electrical engineers